WLKA (88.3 FM) is a radio station  broadcasting contemporary Christian programming from  the K-LOVE radio network. Licensed to Tafton, Pennsylvania, United States, the station serves the Scranton area.  The station is owned by Educational Media Foundation.

The station began broadcasting in 2002 and originally held the call letters WPGP. WPGP was originally owned by Sound of Life, Inc., and was an affiliate of Sound of Life Radio. In November 2006, the station was sold to Educational Media Foundation and became an affiliate of K-LOVE. At this time, its call letters were changed to WLKA.

See also
Other K-LOVE stations in Pennsylvania include:
 WKPA, State College, PA
 WKVP, Philadelphia, PA
 WLKJ, Johnstown, PA
 WPKV, Pittsburgh, PA
 W269AS, Harrisburg, PA

References

External links

K-Love radio stations
LKA
Radio stations established in 2002
2002 establishments in Pennsylvania
Educational Media Foundation radio stations